The Savage Girl is a 1932 American pre-Code film directed by Harry L. Fraser.

Plot
A white jungle goddess is protected by a fierce killer gorilla.

Cast 
Rochelle Hudson as The Girl
Walter Byron as Jim Franklin, misspelled Franklyn in on-screen castlist
Harry Myers as Amos P. Stitch
Adolph Milar as Alec Bernouth
Ted Adams as Chauffeur
Floyd Shackelford as Oscar

External links 

1932 films
1930s English-language films
American black-and-white films
American adventure films
1932 adventure films
Films directed by Harry L. Fraser
Jungle girls
1930s American films